Clover (Hangul: 클로버) is a South Korean hip hop trio under GYM Entertainment in Seoul, South Korea. The group debuted on March 31, 2011, with Classic Over.

Discography

Extended plays

Singles

References

K-pop music groups
Musical groups established in 2011
South Korean dance music groups
South Korean pop music groups
Musical groups from Seoul
2011 establishments in South Korea